Mount Langley is a mountain located on the crest of the Sierra Nevada, on the boundary between Inyo and Tulare counties in eastern California, in the United States. To the east is the Owens Valley, and to the west is the Kern River Valley. It is the ninth-highest peak in the state and the seventh-highest in the Sierra. Mount Langley also has the distinction of being the southernmost fourteener in the United States.

History
Today, the mountain is named after Samuel Pierpont Langley. In the early 1870s, it was confused with Mount Whitney by early climbers, and called by this name. When the mistake was realized, the peak was alternately called Mount Corcoran, Cirque Peak, or Sheep Mountain; the former two names being later attached to other mountains. But its current name became established in local usage, and was made official by the Board on Geographic Names in 1943.

Climbing

Mount Langley is one of the easiest of California's fourteeners to climb. From there hikers travel cross-country to Old Army Pass, where they may pick up the recently constructed Class 1 Mount Langley Trail, which follows a series of large rock cairns for the two mile push to the summit.

Due to the elevation, both passes are covered with snow most of the year. New Army Pass sits on a south-facing slope and it tends to clear of snow somewhat earlier in the season. Old Army Pass is only clear of snow for less than two months per year, from mid-August to early October. During the winter months, even the paved road to Horseshoe Meadow is closed, making the summit significantly harder to reach.

The first recorded climb of the mountain was in 1871 by Clarence King and the French mountaineer Paul Pinson.

See also
 List of mountain peaks of California
 List of California fourteeners

References

External links
 

Fourteeners of California
Mountains of Sequoia National Park
Mountains of the John Muir Wilderness
Mountains of Inyo County, California
Mountains of Tulare County, California
Mountains of Northern California